Filip Yavorov Krastev (born 15 October 2001) is a Bulgarian professional footballer who plays as a midfielder for Bulgarian First League club Levski Sofia on loan from Lommel.

Career 
Krastev joined Slavia Sofia's youth academy in 2010. He made his first team debut at the age of 16 years and 210 days in a 3–0 home loss against Lokomotiv Plovdiv on 13 May 2018, coming on as a substitute for Galin Ivanov. Krastev scored his first senior goal on 24 February 2020, netting the second for Slavia during their 3–1 victory against Dunav Ruse. A week later, he provided an assist to Ivaylo Dimitrov in a 2–1 away win over Levski Sofia.

On 18 June 2020, Slavia announced that Krastev would sign for Premier League club Manchester City in the following week, however on 28 June 2020 Krastev was signed by Belgian First Division B team Lommel, part of the City Football Group, which immediately loaned him back to Slavia until the end of 2020. On 28 January 2021, Krastev joined another City Football Group side, Troyes, on an 18-month loan deal. On 27 August 2021, his loan deal with Troyes was cut short to allow him to join Eredivisie side Cambuur on a season-long loan deal. On 27 January 2022, Krastev returned to Bulgaria to sign for Levski Sofia on a 6-month loan deal. On 28 June 2022, his loan was extended for a further year.

International career 
In August 2020, he received his first call up to the senior side for the UEFA Nations League in September, earning his first cap on 6 September, in a 1–0 away loss against Wales after coming on as a late second-half substitute for Todor Nedelev.

Career statistics

Club

Honours

Club
Levski Sofia
 Bulgarian Cup (1): 2021–22

References

External links
 

Living people
2001 births
Bulgarian footballers
Bulgaria youth international footballers
Bulgaria under-21 international footballers
Bulgaria international footballers
PFC Slavia Sofia players
Lommel S.K. players
ES Troyes AC players
SC Cambuur players
PFC Levski Sofia players
Challenger Pro League players
First Professional Football League (Bulgaria) players
Ligue 2 players
Eredivisie players
Association football midfielders
Bulgarian expatriate footballers
Expatriate footballers in Belgium
Expatriate footballers in France
Expatriate footballers in the Netherlands
Bulgarian expatriate sportspeople in Belgium
Bulgarian expatriate sportspeople in France
Bulgarian expatriate sportspeople in the Netherlands